Linköping is a city in southern Sweden, with around 105,000 inhabitants as of 2021. It is the seat of Linköping Municipality and the capital of Östergötland County. Linköping is also the episcopal see of the Diocese of Linköping (Church of Sweden) and is well known for its cathedral. Linköping is the center of an old cultural region and celebrated its 700th anniversary in 1987. Dominating the city's skyline from afar is the steeple of the cathedral, Domkyrka.

Nowadays, Linköping is known for its university and its high-technology industry. Linköping wants to create a sustainable development of the city and therefore plans to become a carbon-neutral community by 2025.

History

The city is possibly named after the Lionga ting assembly which according to Medieval Scandinavian laws  was the most important thing in Östergötland. Exact location of the Lionga ting is not known, but it was along the Eriksgata. The term "-köping" means there was a market there.

Historically, Linköping is famed for being an early diocese,  1082, second in Sweden (within its pre-1658 boundaries) only to Skara. The diocese is first mentioned in 1104 in the so-called "List of Florence" (Lionga. Kaupinga). The monastery of Vreta Kloster near Roxen north of Linköping was established in 1128, and the oldest parts of the cathedral are also from the 12th century (although it has been changed many times since then, the eye-catching tower with copper roofing being a 19th-century product). On several occasions attempts to achieve a separate Swedish archdiocese were based in Linköping, although, when they finally were successful in 1164, Uppsala was chosen instead.

The coronation of Valdemar Birgersson took place in the cathedral in 1251. In the reign of Gustavus Vasa several important diets were held in the town.

Religious centers tend to become educational centers, and Linköping was no exception. A cathedral school can be traced from 1266. In 1627 the current Linköping cathedral school was established, making it the third oldest gymnasium in Sweden.

Also, Linköping was the site for the final settlement of the dispute between king Sigismund III Vasa and his uncle Duke Charles, the latter prevailing in the battle of Stångebro (today a sports field near central Linköping) on 25 September 1598. This ultimately led to the rise to the throne of Charles (de facto at the 1600 Riksdag of the Estates meeting in Linköping and formally four years later) and the end of the short-lived Swedish-Polish personal union, as well as the execution of five of Charles's political opponents on the main square of Linköping on 20 March 1600.

Linköping was a small town until 1937, when the Saab aircraft industry was formed, starting a period of rapid expansion. Linköping University was established in the 1960s. Today the city is a center of high-technology and software industry.

Climate 
Linköping has a humid continental climate (Dfb), though with maritime influences, retaining the large differences between seasons but being comparatively mild when measured against other areas of the world on similar latitudes. Normally summer highs average in the low 20s and winter temperatures commonly hover just above the freezing point during the day, then falls below it at night.

Demography 

In 2000, 10.9 per cent of the population in Linköping municipality had a foreign background. Since then, the share has gradually increased and in 2019 its share amounted to 23.1 percent. Top 5 largest immigrant communities are:

1.  Iraq – 3850

2.  Somalia - 2345

3.  Eritrea - 1129

4.  Iran - 988

5.  Bosnia and Herzegovina - 667

Culture

Linköping offers a wealth of leisure activities to people of all ages. Residents and visitors are able to enjoy art, theatre, history, concerts, markets, festivals and sporting events.

Special sights of interests are:  the locks of Berg on the Göta Canal, the locks of the Kinda Canal, Gamla Linköping, Valla skogen and Valla fritidsområde (Old Linköping, Valla Wood, and the Valla recreational area), Flygvapen museum (the Air Force Museum), Linköping's domkyrka (the Cathedral), Slotts- och domkyrkomuseet (the Castle and Cathedral Museum) and Östergötlands Länsmuseum (the Östergötland County Museum).  Konsthallen Passagen is an art gallery located in the main square.

Tornby, to the north of the city centre, is a vast shopping area with huge retail outlets and immense parking lots.

The city and its environs offer all sorts of green landscapes to see and experience.  Two examples are a park named after the group responsible for it, Trädgårdsföreningen (The Garden Society), and the Tinnerö area with its oak woodland.  Local bodies of water include the lakes Roxen, Rängen and Järnlunden, the River Stångån/Kinda Canal and the Göta Canal with the Berg locks. These areas can be accessed by foot, bicycle, or boat.

Linköping is the home of the Linköping Symphony Orchestra. The city is one of the sites of the Östergötland Music Days each summer, and the host of the Student Orchestra Festival in May every other year. One of the most notable choirs in Linköping is the Linköping University Male Voice Choir.

Linköping is also the home of theatrical heavy metal band Ghost and rock band the Pusjkins (sv).

The area around the main square was re-planned in the 1960s, and many old houses were destroyed. Some, however, were moved to Gamla Linköping (Old Linköping), in the city's western part, neighbouring the university's main campus. It is a living museum environment and a popular site with both residents and tourists.

NärCon, the largest anime and gaming convention in the Nordic countries, is held in Linköping.

Sport
Teams from Linköping are prominent in floorball, volleyball (Linköpings VC) and ice hockey (Linköpings HC (see above), or "Cluben" as some fans refer to it). The hockey team allied itself with Linköping's women's football team and created Linköpings FC, which plays in the highest division. The team won the Swedish Cup in 2006 and 2014. The world's largest floorball club Linköping Innebandy resides in the indoor sports arena in the city centre. The city continues to lack a first-class men's team in football with several teams competing in the lower leagues.

Other sports clubs include:

 BK Derby
 Derby/Linköping BK
 BK Kenty
 LiU AIF FK
 Hjulsbro IK
 IK Östria Lambohov
 Karle IF
 Linköpings ASS
 Malmslätts AIK
 Linköpings SF
 Linköpings Budoklubb
Ekängen IF

Orienteering 
Linköping hosted the 1968 World Orienteering Championships.

Politics and government
General elections were held in Sweden on 14 September 2014 to elect the Riksdag, all 21 county councils and 290 municipal assemblies.

The local Social Democrats (S; Social Demokraterna), Green Party (MP; Miljöpartiet) and the Liberal People's Party (L; Liberalerna, formerly FP; Folk Partiet) formed a coalition majority named "coalition for Linköping" with 40 out of 79 mandates,
while the minority opposition in Linköping consist each separate by:
the Moderate Party (M; Moderaterna), Centre Party (C; Center Partiet), Christian Democrats (Kristdemokraterna), Left Party (V; Vänsterpartiet)
and the Sweden Democrats (SD; Sverige Demokraterna).

The Swedish Air Force Museum is located near the town.

Economy
One of the biggest employers in Linköping is Saab which among other products manufactures the SAAB Gripen fighter jet and where the SAAB 340 twin-engine commuter turboprop was produced.  The city also has a strong presence in information technology with the headquarters of IFS AB, Sectra AB and Cambio Healthcare Systems AB, as well as the presence of Motorola, Ericsson, Infor, and many others. Toyota Industries Sweden AB has a presence in Linköping, as one of its subsidiaries, BT Industries, is located in nearby Mjölby.

Transport
The city is situated south of lake Roxen (which is part of the historically important water paths Motala ström and the Göta Canal) where the E4, Sweden's highway backbone, crosses the river Stångån (and Kinda kanal). It is situated on the main southern railway line connecting Stockholm with Malmö and Danish capital Copenhagen.  Linköping/Saab Airport offers daily connections to Amsterdam.

In 2019, the city started experimenting with two autonomous buses that run along a 2 km route around the university campus.

Education
The city is home to Linköping University and its associated hospital Linköping University Hospital. The Katedralskolan is the third oldest gymnasium in the country.

Notable residents

Ghost
Dead Soul
Tobias Forge
Martin Axenrot
Charlotta Berger
Jöns Jacob Berzelius
Hans Brask
Elsa Brändström
Fredrik Bringnäs
Magnus Bäckstedt
Oscar Cesare
Tage Danielsson
Gustav Forsling
Cecilia Frode
Thomas Funck
Glam Sam And His Combo (Mats Samuelsson)
Marie Göranzon
Rutger Gunnarsson
Gunnar Hoffsten
Louise Hoffsten
Patrik Jensen
Kettil Karlsson (Vasa)
Paul Lindvall
Anders Ljungstedt
Martin Lönnebo
Olaus Magnus
Mercedes Masöhn
Ludwig Göransson
Erik Sagström
Magnus Andersson
Pierre Thorsson
André Oscar Wallenberg
Lars Winnerbäck
Bruno K. Öijer
Jenni Asserholt
Magnus Johansson
Jonna Lee (of iamamiwhoami)
Theoz
Sofie Louise Johansson

City districts
Source in Swedish:

Innerstaden
Ramshäll
Vimanshäll
Djurgården
Ekholmen
Ekkällan
Johannelund
Berga
Garnisonen
Gottfridsberg
Hackefors
Hejdegården
Hjulsbro
Jägarvallen
Kallerstad
Lambohov
Mjärdevi
Ryd
Skäggetorp
Tallboda
Tannefors
Tornby
Ullstämma
Västra Valla
Östra Valla
Vasastaden
Vidingsjö

See also
Diocese of Linköping
Roundabout dog
Linköping University
Linköping Bloodbath
2019 Linköping explosion

References

External links

 
 www.visitlinkoping.se – The official visitors guide to Linköping

 
County seats in Sweden
Municipal seats of Östergötland County
Swedish municipal seats
Populated places in Östergötland County
Populated places in Linköping Municipality
Market towns in Sweden
Cities in Östergötland County